Erin  is a historic home located near Front Royal, Warren County, Virginia. It was built in 1848, and is a three part Palladian plan dwelling with a two-story central section and -story flanking wings.  The front facade features a two-story tetrastyle pedimented portico in the Greek Ionic order.  The frame dwelling has impressive Greek Revival detailing on both its exterior and interior.  Also on the property are the contributing kitchen, law office, dairy, meat smokehouse, chicken house, and granary.

It was listed on the National Register of Historic Places in 1979, and was listed again as part of the Rockland Rural Historic District in 2015.

References

External links
 

Houses on the National Register of Historic Places in Virginia
Greek Revival houses in Virginia
Houses completed in 1848
Houses in Warren County, Virginia
National Register of Historic Places in Warren County, Virginia
Front Royal, Virginia
Individually listed contributing properties to historic districts on the National Register in Virginia